Malcolm O'Kelly (born 19 July 1974) is an Irish former rugby union player who played as a lock for Ireland and Leinster.

O'Kelly was born in Chelmsford, England, and attended Templeogue College secondary school in Dublin, Ireland. He has played for the Barbarians FC three times, wearing his old school socks. O'Kelly completed a B.A. in Engineering at Trinity College, Dublin between 1992 and 1996.

The  O'Kelly, who made his international début in 1997 against New Zealand, became a talisman of the Irish side and was Ireland's all-time caps leader, surpassing Mike Gibson, on 12 February 2005 when he started in Ireland's Six Nations fixture against Scotland. O'Kelly not only earned his 70th cap, but scored Ireland's first try in the match, giving them a lead they never relinquished. O'Kelly has since been surpassed by Ronan O'Gara (128caps), Brian O'Driscoll (124 caps), John Hayes (105 caps) Johnny Sexton (99 caps), Peter Stringer (98 caps) and Donncha O'Callaghan (94 caps) but earned 92 test caps in his career.

O'Kelly also played with the British & Irish Lions on their tour to Australia, and had been named in the Lions squad for their 2005 tour of New Zealand, but aggravated a groin injury in training and was replaced by Simon Shaw. He has five Lions caps.

At the end of the 09/10 season, O'Kelly announced his retirement from professional rugby. He is the only player in the Heineken cup to have played since the start of the competition – 15 years. He claims to have won a grand slam, the Heineken cup, the Magners League(3) and 4 Triple Crowns: he is also Ireland's third most capped second row. As well as that, he is a two time British and Irish Lion.

O'Kelly is a supporter of the children's charity Plan Ireland and is a committee member of the rugby sevens club, Shamrock Warriors RFC.

References

External links
Leinster profile
Ireland Profile
Profile at sporting-heroes.net, including caps from 1997–2000 (Retrieved 6 February 2005)
Profile at sporting-heroes.net, including caps from 2001–2002 (Retrieved 6 February 2005)
Profile at sporting-heroes.net, including caps from 2003–present (Retrieved 6 February 2005)

1974 births
Living people
Irish rugby union players
Ireland international rugby union players
Leinster Rugby players
St Mary's College RFC players
Dublin University Football Club players
London Irish players
Rugby union locks
British & Irish Lions rugby union players from Ireland
Barbarian F.C. players
Sportspeople from Essex